Finerty is a surname. Notable people with the surname include:

Christopher E. Finerty (born  1970), United States Air Force general
Joseph E. Finerty  (1905–1992), American politician
John F. Finerty (1846–1908), American politician